José Luis Ortiz Melgar (born 17 November 1985) is a Bolivian professional football midfielder who most recently played for Real Potosí.

Club career
After playing in the youth teams of Bayern Munich that discovered him in Tahuichi Academy in Bolivia, he played as senior with Saarbrücken, Slovenian Nafta Lendava, Bolivia  Bolívar, Oriente Petrolero y Real Potosí in the Bolivian Primera División.

International career
José Luis Ortiz was part of the Bolivian team at the 2003 South American Youth Championship.

Honours
FC Bayern Munich II
IFA Shield: 2005

References

External sources
 
 
 

1985 births
Living people
Sportspeople from Santa Cruz de la Sierra
Association football midfielders
Bolivian footballers
Bolivia international footballers
Bolivian expatriate footballers
FC Bayern Munich II players
1. FC Saarbrücken players
Expatriate footballers in Germany
NK Nafta Lendava players
Expatriate footballers in Slovenia
Montevideo Wanderers F.C. players
Expatriate footballers in Uruguay
Oriente Petrolero players
Club Real Potosí players